Anna Bader (born 12 December 1983 in Mutlangen, Baden-Württemberg, West Germany) is a German high diver. She competed in the 2013 World Aquatics Championships in Barcelona, Spain the Red Bull Cliff Diving World Series in 2013, 2014 and 2015, and the 2015 World Aquatics Championships in Kazan, Russia.

2013 World Aquatic Championships 
The 2013 World Aquatics Championships were held in Barcelona, Spain. She won the bronze medal at the 2013 World Aquatics Championships in Barcelona, Spain at the High diving event behind Cesilie Carlton and Ginger Huber. She scored 203.90 for an overall score.

Round 1 

For round 1 she did a back armstand 1 1/2 somersault and scored 65.00 points.

Round 2 
For round 2 she did a front 3 somersault with 1 1/2 twist and scored 72.60 points.

Round 3 
For round 3 she did a back 2 somersault with 2 twists and scored 66.30 points.

Other
In 2014 is coach for Calzedonia Ocean Girls.

References

External links

1983 births
Living people
People from Mutlangen
Sportspeople from Stuttgart (region)
German female divers
Female high divers
World Aquatics Championships medalists in high diving
20th-century German women
21st-century German women